Haugaard and  Haugard are surnames of Danish and Norwegian origin which derive from the Old Norse word haugr which can be translated to mean hill, knoll, or mound. Other derivatives include  Hauge, Haugan, Haugen and Haugland.

Haugaard may refer to:

 Erik Christian Haugaard (1923–2009), American author 
 Harald Haugaard, Danish fiddler, composer, and producer
 Jacob Haugaard (born 1952), Danish comedian, actor and politician 
 Svend Haugaard (1913–2003), Danish politician
William Haugaard, New York State architect

Danish-language surnames
Norwegian-language surnames